Richard Adam Adubato (born November 23, 1937) is an American former basketball coach in the National Basketball Association.  He has served as head coach for three NBA teams, the Detroit Pistons, the Dallas Mavericks, and the Orlando Magic.

He was promoted from assistant to head coach of the Detroit Pistons on an interim basis upon the dismissal of Dick Vitale on November 8, 1979. His first game at the helm was a 106–98 Pistons win over the Philadelphia 76ers at the Pontiac Silverdome the following night on November 9.

Adubato replaced Brian Hill halfway through the 1996–97 season and guided the Magic to a 21–12 record and made their fourth consecutive playoff appearance. The Magic then nearly upset Pat Riley's Miami Heat in the playoffs with the help of spectacular play from Penny Hardaway, but ultimately lost the series 3–2.

In 1999, Adubato became head coach for the New York Liberty of the Women's National Basketball Association, making his WNBA debut on June 10, 1999 when he guided the Liberty to an 87–60 victory over the defending Eastern Conference champion Cleveland Rockers. With the Liberty posting impressive attendance figures for the third straight season, Madison Square Garden played host to the first-ever WNBA All-Star Game - a sellout (18,649) - on July 14, 1999. Four Liberty players were selected to the Eastern Conference squad: Rebecca Lobo, Teresa Weatherspoon, Kym Hampton, and Vickie Johnson. 

With Adubato at the helm, the Liberty posted an overall mark of 18-14 and won its first Eastern Conference title. After defeating Charlotte in the first round of the playoffs, the team faced a rematch with the defending WNBA champion Houston Comets. Despite falling short of the title, the series was pushed to a third game when Weatherspoon made the most famous shot in WNBA history -- a half-court, buzzer-beating shot that won Game 2 before a stunned Houston squad and Compaq Center crowd.

Under Adubato, the Liberty went to the finals three out of four seasons and won the Eastern Conference regular-season championship three times.

Adubato took over as coach of the Washington Mystics, but left the Mystics on June 1, 2007, reportedly upset over his team's 0–4 start to the season, a number of recent transactions, and his contract status.

During his NBA coaching career, Adubato replaced Dick Vitale as head coach of the Detroit Pistons after 12 games of the 1979–80 season. He later was head coach of the Dallas Mavericks for 264 games between 1989 and 1992. 

Adubato currently serves as the radio color analyst for the Orlando Magic.

Adubato has also been an assistant NBA coach for the Cleveland Cavaliers, Dallas Mavericks, Detroit Pistons, New York Knicks, and Orlando Magic and an NBA scout for the Atlanta Hawks.

Head coaching record

NBA

|-
| align="left" |Detroit
| align="left" |
|70||12||58||||align="center" |6th in Central||–||–||–||–
| align="center" |Missed Playoffs
|-
| align="left" |Dallas
| align="left" |
|71||42||29||||align="center" |3rd in Midwest||3||0||3||.000
| align="center" |Lost in First Round
|-
| align="left" |Dallas
| align="left" |
|82||28||54||||align="center" |6th in Midwest||–||–||–||–
| align="center" |Missed Playoffs
|-
| align="left" |Dallas
| align="left" |
|82||22||60||||align="center" |5th in Midwest||–||–||–||–
| align="center" |Missed Playoffs
|-
| align="left" |Dallas
| align="left" |
|29||2||27||||align="center" |(fired)||–||–||–||–
| align="center" |–
|-
| align="left" |Orlando
| align="left" |
|33||21||12||||align="center" |3rd in Atlantic||5||2||3||.400
| align="center" |Lost in First Round
|-class="sortbottom"
| align="left" |Career
|||367||127||240||||||8||2||6||.250||

WNBA

|-
| align="left" | New York
| align="left" |1999
|32||18||14||.563|| align="center" |1st in East||6||3||3||.500
| align="center" |Lost in WNBA Finals
|-
| align="left" |New York
| align="left" |2000
|32||20||12||.625|| align="center" |1st in East||7||4||3||.571
| align="center" |Lost in WNBA Finals
|-
| align="left" |New York
| align="left" |2001
|32||21||11||.656|| align="center" |2nd in East||6||3||3||.500
| align="center" |Lost in Conf. Finals
|-
| align="left" |New York
| align="left" |2002
|32||18||14||.563|| align="center" |1st in East||8||4||4||.500
| align="center" |Lost in WNBA Finals
|-
| align="left" |New York
| align="left" |2003
|34||16||18||.471|| align="center" |6th in East||–||–||–||–
| align="center" |Missed Playoffs
|-
| align="left" |New York
| align="left" |2004
|16||7||9||.438|| align="center" |(fired)||–||–||–||–
| align="center" |–
|-
| align="left" |Washington
| align="left" |2005
|34||16||18||.471|| align="center" |5th in East||–||–||–||–
| align="center" |Missed Playoffs
|-
| align="left" |Washington
| align="left" |2006
|34||18||16||.529|| align="center" |4th in East||2||0||2||.000
| align="center" |Lost in First Round
|-
| align="left" |Washington
| align="left" |2007
|4||0||4||.000|| align="center" |(resigned)||–||–||–||–
| align="center" |–
|-class="sortbottom"
| align="left" |Career
| ||250||134||116||.536|| ||29||14||15||.483||

References

External links

 NBA career stats as a head coach at Basketball-Reference
 WNBA career stats as a head coach at Basketball-Reference
 WNBA.com biography

1937 births
Living people
American men's basketball coaches
American women's basketball coaches
Atlanta Hawks assistant coaches
Basketball coaches from New Jersey
Cleveland Cavaliers assistant coaches
Dallas Mavericks assistant coaches
Dallas Mavericks head coaches
Detroit Pistons assistant coaches
Detroit Pistons head coaches
New York Knicks assistant coaches
New York Liberty head coaches
Orlando Magic assistant coaches
Orlando Magic head coaches
People from Irvington, New Jersey
Sportspeople from Essex County, New Jersey
Upsala Vikings men's basketball coaches
Washington Mystics head coaches
William Paterson University alumni